The 2004 Army Black Knights football team represented the United States Military Academy as a member of Conference USA (C-USA) during the 2004 NCAA Division I-A football season.

Schedule

References

Army
Army Black Knights football seasons
Army Black Knights football